The Poltva is a river in the western Ukrainian Oblast of Lviv and a tributary of the Bug. The Poltva valley cuts between  the Podilian Plateau and Roztichia. The capital of the Lviv Oblast, Lviv, is located on the river, with the river flowing directly beneath Lviv's central street, Freedom Avenue (Prospect Svobody), and the Lviv Theatre of Opera and Ballet. 

The river once faced significant problems with pollution. As a result, the river was covered up and included into the underground sewer system of Lviv, beginning in 1839. During World War 2, the underground river was used as a hiding place for Jews fleeing Nazi violence.

References

External links
  Pełtew in the Geographical Dictionary of the Kingdom of Poland (1886)

Rivers of Lviv Oblast
Subterranean rivers